These are the Billboard magazine Dance/Mix Show Airplay number-one hits of 2015.

Note that Billboard publishes charts with an issue date approximately 7–10 days in advance.

See also
2015 in music
List of Mainstream Top 40 number-one hits of 2015 (U.S.)
List of Billboard Rhythmic number-one songs of the 2010s
List of number-one dance singles of 2015 (U.S.)
List of number-one Dance/Electronic Songs of 2015 (U.S.)

References

External links
BDS Dance Airplay Chart (updated weekly)

2015
United States Dance Airplay